Singapore sling is a cocktail named after the place where the drink was developed

Singapore Sling may also refer to:

 Singapore Sling (tax avoidance), a corporate tax avoidance scheme
 Singapore Sling (1990 film), a Greek art film
 Singapore Sling (1993 film), an Australian TV movie
 Singapore Sling (band), an Icelandic shoegaze rock 'n' roll band
 Singapore Slingers, a basketball team
 Singapore Sling, the nickname of the former turn 10 chicane at the Marina Bay Street Circuit